Peter B. Dervan (born June 28, 1945) is the Bren Professor of Chemistry at the California Institute of Technology. The primary focus of his research is the development and study of small organic molecules that can sequence-specifically recognize DNA, a field in which he is an internationally recognized authority. The most important of these small molecules are pyrrole–imidazole polyamides.
Dervan is credited with influencing "the course of research in organic chemistry through his studies at the interface of chemistry and biology" as a result of his work on "the chemical principles involved in sequence-specific recognition of double helical DNA".
He is the recipient of many awards, including the National Medal of Science (2006).

Early life and education
Peter B. Dervan was born on June 28, 1945 in Boston, Massachusetts.
Dervan received his B.S. degree from Boston College in 1967, where professor Francis Bennett sparked his interest in synthetic organic chemistry. He began graduate studies at the University of Wisconsin then moved with Jerome A. Berson's research group to Yale University where he completed his graduate research in physical organic chemistry, studying ways in which chemical bonds are created and broken apart.  He received his Ph.D. degree from Yale in 1972, for The Stereochemistry of the Thermal Rearrangements of Trans-1,2-Dialkenylcyclobutanes and Cis-1,2-Dialkenylcyclobutanes. He then became an NIH postdoctoral fellow at Stanford.

Career

Dervan became an assistant professor of chemistry at Caltech in 1973, joining John D. Roberts, Robert G. Bergman and Robert Ellsworth Ireland in the organic chemistry group. He became an associate professor in 1979, and professor in 1982. He was appointed as the first Bren Professor of Chemistry in 1988. He served as Chair of Caltech's Division of Chemistry and Chemical Engineering from 1994 to 1999. Dervan has published more than 325 papers and taught hundreds of students.

Dervan is a member of the National Academy of Sciences (1986), 
the American Academy of Arts and Sciences (1987), and 
the American Philosophical Society (2002). 
He is an elected member of the French Academy of Sciences (2000) 
and the Deutsche Akademie der Naturforscher Leopoldina (2004- ).

Dervan is a co-founder and founding member of the Scientific Advisory Board for Gilead Sciences (1987). He served on the Board of Directors for Beckman Coulter beginning in 1997.  He served as a Trustee of Yale University (2008-2017).  He serves as a member of the Board of Scientific Governors of The Scripps Research Institute.  In 2014, he presented the ACS Chemical Biology Lecture.   he became chair of the scientific advisory board of the Robert A. Welch Foundation.

Research
While teaching a class at Caltech in Advanced Organic Chemistry, Dervan came to a realization that would guide his future career: rather than working to "close" a classic problem that had been previously defined, he would seek to define and "open" a new research area that could be studied for many years.  
The problem he chose was molecular recognition in biological systems.  At the time, DNA sequencing was in its infancy and the human genome project was undreamt of. Dervan chose to apply ideas from synthetic chemistry to biology and the study of DNA, creating novel binding molecules to be used for DNA recognition.

By studying weak intermolecular interactions and creating novel synthetic molecules specific to particular DNA sequences, Dervan has been able to explore the complex biological systems underlying DNA's structure and function.  A human cell contains approximately 20,000 genes, whose expression is controlled by the binding of protein transcription factors in the promoter region of each gene. Through pioneering work in DNA recognition, Dervan has determined many of the chemical principles underlying sequence-specific recognition of DNA, and enabled researchers to better understand the mechanism of action of many anti-tumor, anti-viral and anti-biotic drugs.

Dervan determined that small molecules could be synthesized and used to selectively bind DNA at the transcription factor/DNA interface, effectively rewriting the biological codes controlling transcription by acting on the promoters of selected genes. 
The creation of synthetic small molecules with affinities and sequence specificities for predetermined DNA sequences makes it possible to design cell-permeable molecules for the regulation of gene expression.
The use of small molecules to regulate gene expression in living cells has possible application to human medicine.

The most important of these small molecules are pyrrole–imidazole polyamides. Dervan's lab has identified pairing rules to control the DNA sequence specificity of minor-groove binding polyamides that contain the aromatic ring amino acids hydroxypyrrole (Hp), imidazole (Im), and pyrrole (Py).

Awards
Dervan has received a number of awards for both research and teaching, including those listed below.  He was awarded the 2006 National Medal of Science in 2007 from President George Bush at the White House for “his fundamental research contributions at the interface of organic chemistry and biology” as well as contributions to education and industry. A minor planet has been named in his honor, 4314 Dervan.

 1988 - Harrison Howe Award
 1993 - Arthur C. Cope Award
 1993 - Willard Gibbs Award
 1994 - William H. Nichols Medal, for "his outstanding contributions in the field of bioorganic chemistry through the design and synthesis of sequence-specific DNA cleaving molecules."
 1996 - Maison de la Chimie Foundation Prize
 1998 - Remsen Award
 1998 - Kirkwood Medal, for “outstanding research contributions, theoretical or experimental, in the physical sciences.”
 1999 - Alfred Bader Award
 1999 - Max Tishler Prize
 1999 - Linus Pauling Award
 1999 - Richard C. Tolman Medal
 2000 - Tetrahedron Prize
 2002 - Harvey Prize (Israel)
 2005 - Ronald Breslow Award
 2005 - Wilbur Cross Medal
 2006 - National Medal of Science
 2009 - Frank Westheimer Prize
 2022 - Priestley Medal

Personal

In 1990, Dervan married Jacqueline Barton, a fellow chemist and professor at Caltech. He has a son, Andrew, from a previous marriage, and a daughter, Elizabeth, from his marriage with Barton. All four hold degrees from Yale University.

Selected publications

References

External links
Personal biography

1945 births
Living people
Organic chemists
21st-century American chemists
Members of the United States National Academy of Sciences
Gilead Sciences people
National Medal of Science laureates
Members of the French Academy of Sciences
California Institute of Technology faculty
Boston College alumni
University of Wisconsin–Madison alumni
Yale University alumni
Members of the National Academy of Medicine